The International Association of Wood Anatomists (IAWA) is an association that studies wood anatomy formed in 1931. Their office is currently based in the Netherlands.

They have been cited as a source by Mongabay, used as a supporting reference in plant biology books and their activities have been talked about by ABC Online.

Bibliography
1962: International glossary of terms used in wood anatomy
1964: Multilingual Glossary of Terms Used in Wood Anatomy
1980: Wood Identification: An Annotated Bibliography
1981 (August, reprinted March 2013): New Perspectives in Wood Anatomy: Published on the Occasion of the 50th Anniversary of the International Association of Wood Anatomists
1989: IAWA List of Microscopic Features for Hardwood Identification
1994: Directory of Members
1996: Recent advances in wood anatomy
1999: Dendrochronology in monsoon Asia: proceedings of a Workshop on Southeast Asian Dendrochronology held in Chiang Mai, Thailand, 16–20 February 1998
2004: IAWA list of microscopic features for softwood identification

Bulletins
1985: IAWA Bulletin, Volumes 6-7
1989: IAWA Bulletin, Volume 10
1990: IAWA Bulletin, Volume 11
1991: IAWA Bulletin, Volume 12

Journals
1993: IAWA Journal, Volume 14
1994: IAWA Journal, Volume 15
volume 16 info needed
1997: IAWA Journal, Volume 17
1997: IAWA Journal, Volume 18
1998: IAWA Journal, Volume 19
volumes 20 to 26 info needed
2006: IAWA Journal, Volume 27
2007: IAWA Journal, Volume 28
2008: IAWA Journal, Volume 29

References

External links
Official website (active since at least 2006)

Botany organizations
1931 establishments in the Netherlands
Scientific organisations based in the Netherlands
Scientific organizations established in 1931